William Martinet (born 6 September 1988) is a French politician from La France Insoumise. He was elected member of the National Assembly for Yvelines's 11th constituency in the 2022 French legislative election.

See also 

 List of deputies of the 16th National Assembly of France

References 

1988 births
Living people
Politicians from Paris
21st-century French politicians
Members of Parliament for Yvelines

Deputies of the 16th National Assembly of the French Fifth Republic
La France Insoumise politicians